Leondra Roshawn Gay (born April 24, 2001), known by her stage name Monaleo (pronounced mo-nuh-lee-o) is an American rapper and songwriter based in Houston. She released her debut single, "Beating Down Yo Block," on February 24, 2021,

Early life 
Gay originates from El Paso and grew up in Houston, Texas. Gay attended The High School for Law Enforcement and Criminal Justice, located in Houston. She was pursuing a degree at Prairie View A&M University before putting her studies on pause due to her musical career.

Career 
Gay began working in music intermittently since January 2020. In September 2020, she released a snippet of her debut single "Beating Down Yo Block" with producer Merion Krazy. The song samples "Knockin Pictures Off Da Wall"  by Yungstar. She wrote the song while struggling with a bad breakup. The song went viral on social media January 2021 with over 3 million streams on Spotify and 3.3 million views on the music video on YouTube. Monaleo later released the singles "Girls Outside" and "Suck It Up." "Girls Outside" samples "Outside” by OG Bobby Billions. Monaleo released a music video for the single, "Suck It Up."

Gay is represented by the Stomp Down collective.

Personal life 
Gay's younger brother is rapper Yung Rampage. She has publicly shared about her past suicide attempts and mental health.

Discography

Singles 

 "Beating Down Yo Block" (2021)
 "Girls Outside" (2021)
 "Suck It Up" (2021)
 "We Not Humping" (2021)
 “Body Bag” (2022)

References 

Living people
21st-century American women singers
21st-century American singers
African-American women rappers
American women rappers
Rappers from Houston
2001 births